The Pakistan national cricket team toured Australia in the 1972–73 season and played three Test matches against the Australian national cricket team. After an inadequate preparation against weak teams, Pakistan lost by an innings in the first Test in Adelaide.  While Australia won the series 3–0, the last two tests were competitive, with Pakistan seeming the likely winner on the second last days. The 2nd test in Melbourne was attended by 115,721. Pakistan also visited Sri Lanka and played a match against the Sri Lankan national cricket team and followed the tour with a series against New Zealand, where both teams played their first ODI.

Touring team

 Intikhab Alam (captain)
 Asif Iqbal
 Asif Masood
 Majid Khan
 Majid Usman
 Masood Iqbal
 Mohammad Ilyas
 Mushtaq Mohammad
 Nasim-ul-Ghani
 Pervez Sajjad
 Sadiq Mohammad
 Saeed Ahmed
 Saleem Altaf
 Sarfraz Nawaz
 Talat Ali
 Wasim Bari
 Zaheer Abbas

Test series summary

First Test

Second Test

Third Test

Sri Lanka
The Pakistan team had a stopover in Colombo en route to Australia and played a first-class match there between 9 and 11 November against the Sri Lankan national cricket team, which at that time did not have Test status. The match was drawn. Sri Lanka were captained by Michael Tissera and Pakistan by Intikhab Alam.

See also 
 Pakistani cricket team in New Zealand in 1972–73

References

Annual reviews
 Playfair Cricket Annual 1973
 Wisden Cricketers' Almanack 1974

Further reading
 Bill Frindall, The Wisden Book of Test Cricket 1877-1978, Wisden, 1979
 Chris Harte, A History of Australian Cricket, André Deutsch, 1993

External links
 Pakistan tour of Australia 1972-73  on ESPN Cricinfo
 CricketArchive – tour summaries

1972 in Australian cricket
1972 in Pakistani cricket
1972 in Sri Lankan cricket
1972–73 Australian cricket season
1973 in Australian cricket
1973 in Pakistani cricket
International cricket competitions from 1970–71 to 1975
1972-73
1972
Sri Lankan cricket seasons from 1972–73 to 1999–2000